Jacks were a 1960s Japanese psychedelic rock group who released their best known studio album Vacant World in 1968.

History
The Jacks, originally known as "Nightingale", began their career in 1966 as a folk trio. After jazz drummer Takasuke Kida joined the group they headed into a new musical direction. Vacant World, released in 1968 as Karappo No Sekai [Vacant World] or Jacks no Sekai [Jacks' World] in Japanese, is widely seen as one of the most important Japanese albums. The song "Vacant World" (or "Karappo no Sekai" in Japanese) was famously banned from Japanese airwaves due to lyrical content. The Jacks' musical legacy has carried on in Japan despite the fact that their career was quite short, disbanding shortly before the release of their second studio album Super Session (Jacks No Kiseki in Japanese).

After the breakup of Jacks, singer Yoshio Hayakawa released one acclaimed solo album before retiring from music, only to reemerge again as a solo artist during the 1990s. Drummer Takasuke Kida died in a car accident in 1980.

Musical style
Jacks played in a distinct musical style fused with ambient psychedelic, surf, folk and jazz. The group had a dark, introspective sound with an exploratory, improvisational edge and sometimes headed into moody instrumental excursions. The Jacks typically employed reverb, tremolo and subtle fuzz-guitar and also utilized the vibraphone, organ and wind instruments such as the flute.  Lead singer Yoshio Hayakawa sung in Japanese and typically ranged from a low, calm and tranquil voice to throaty, desperate sounding wails. Similarly, drummer Takasuke Kida would follow suit, going from subtle jazzy sounding fills to complicated, offbeat rhythms and manic cymbal crashes.

Personnel
Yoshio Hayakawa – vocals, rhythm guitar
Haruo Mizuhashi – lead guitar, vocals
Hitoshi Tanino – Fender bass, upright bass
Takasuke Kida – drums, flute, vibraphone

Discography

Albums
 Vacant World [Jacks No Sekai] (Toshiba Express, September 1968)
 Super Session [Jacks No Kiseki] (Toshiba Express, October 1969)
 Jacks' Greatest Hits (Toshiba Express, 1972)
 Live '68 (H.A.F., 1973 - fan club release)
 Echoes In The Radio (radio sessions) (Toshiba Eastworld, June 1986)

Vacant World and Super Session are in print by EMI Japan.

Singles
 "Karappo No Sekai" b/w "Iikodane" (Takt/Million, March 1968)
 "Marianne" b/w "Tokei Wo Tomete" (Takt Million, May 1968)
 "Karappo No Sekai" b/w "Tokei Wo Tomete" (Columbia, September 1968)
 "Kono Michi" b/w "Karappo No Sekai" (album version) (Toshiba Express, October 1968)
 "Joe's Rock" b/w "Flower" (Toshiba Express, October 1969)

References

External links 
 Detailed discussion (in English) of Jacks releases (2009)
 Jacks. Sanslös japans 60-talspsych An article about Jacks by Jonas Stål in the Swedish magazine Kolet 2011

Japanese rock music groups
Japanese psychedelic rock music groups
Musical groups established in 1966
Musical groups disestablished in 1968